World Victory Road Presents: Sengoku 7 was a mixed martial arts-event promoted by World Victory Road. It took place on March 20, 2009.

Results

See also
 World Victory Road
 List of Sengoku champions
 2009 in World Victory Road

Notes    
WVR originally wanted both Shooto world champion "Lion Takeshi" Takeshi Inoue and Deep titlist Dokonjonosuke Mishima to participate in the tournament but Inoue was unable due to Shooto putting him on their May 10 fight card while Mishima suffered a knee injury.
Michihiro Omigawa's fight with Shintaro Ishiwatari in Shooto on January 18 were originally scheduled to be an eliminator for participation in the tournament. However, the bout ended in a draw and both were later invited to participate.

References

External links
Official fight card

World Victory Road events
2009 in mixed martial arts
Sports competitions in Tokyo

ja:戦極の乱2009